Amos Russel Wells (23 December 1862, in Glens Falls, New York – 6 March 1933, in Massachusetts) was a United States editor, author and professor.

He graduated from Antioch College in 1883. He was professor of Greek and geology at Antioch College from 1883 to 1891 and from 1891 editor of the Christian Endeavor World, Boston. From 1901, he was associate author of Peloubet's Notes on the Sunday School Lessons. He was a member of the International Sunday-School Lesson Committee. He was a voluminous author, no less than 63 titles being credited to his pen. His works include books dealing with young people's work, the Sunday school, juvenile fiction, poetry and devotional literature.

Notes

References

1862 births
1933 deaths
Antioch College alumni
Antioch College faculty
American editors
American male writers